Charles C. Steidel (born October 14, 1962) is an American astronomer, and Lee A. DuBridge Professor of Astronomy at California Institute of Technology.

Life
He graduated from Princeton University with an AB in Astrophysical Sciences, and from California Institute of Technology with a PhD in Astronomy, in 1990.
On November 7, 1987, he married Sarah Nichols Hoyt.

Awards
 2010 Gruber Cosmology Prize from The Peter and Patricia Gruber Foundation in recognition of his revolutionary studies of the most distant galaxies in the universe 
 2002 MacArthur Fellows Program

Works
"The Structure and Kinematics of the Circum-Galactic Medium from Far-UV Spectra of z~2-3 Galaxies", Cosmology and Extragalactic Astrophysics, Authors: C. C. Steidel, D. K. Erb, A. E. Shapley, M. Pettini, N. A. Reddy, M. Bogosavljević, G. C. Rudie, O. Rakic

References

External links
"Charles C. Steidel", Scientific Commons
"Steidel, Charles C.", NASA Technical Reports

1962 births
American astronomers
California Institute of Technology faculty
California Institute of Technology alumni
Princeton University alumni
MacArthur Fellows
Scientists from Ithaca, New York
Living people